The Philippines participated in the 17th Southeast Asian Games held in Singapore from 12 to 20 June 1993.

Medalists

Gold

Silver

Bronze

Multiple

Medal summary

By sports

References

External links
http://www.olympic.ph

Southeast Asian Games
Nations at the 1993 Southeast Asian Games
1993